Alison Sinclair may refer to:

 Alison Sinclair (literary critic), professor of modern Spanish literature and intellectual history
 Alison Sinclair (virologist), professor of molecular virology
 Alison Sinclair (author) (born 1959), British physician and author